The Stamp Act of 1712 (cited either as 10 Ann. c. 18 or as 10 Ann. c. 19) was an act passed in the Kingdom of Great Britain on 1 August 1712 to create a new tax on publishers, particularly of newspapers. Newspapers were subjected to tax and price increased. The stamp tax was a tax on each newspaper and thus hit cheaper papers and popular readership harder than wealthy consumers (because it formed a higher proportion of the purchase price). It was increased in 1797, reduced in 1836 and was finally ended in 1855, thus allowing a cheap press. It was enforced until its repeal in 1855. The initial assessed rate of tax was one penny per whole newspaper sheet, a halfpenny for a half sheet, and one shilling per advertisement contained within. The act had a potentially chilling effect on publishers; Jonathan Swift was a frequent publisher of newspapers, and complained in a letter about the new tax. Other than newspapers, it required that all pamphlets, legal documents, commercial bills, advertisements, and other papers issued the tax. The tax is blamed for the decline of English literature critical of the government during the period, notably with The Spectator ending the same year of the tax's enactment. It would see increasingly greater taxes and wider spectrum of materials affected until its repeal in 1855.

Provisions of the Act
The Act raised £5,536 worth of stamps within the first year of operation. This duty would be further increased throughout its lifetime, with the maximum tax of four pence on all newspapers and three shillings and six pence on all advertisements. Publications which were sponsored by the government, or received sponsorship after the act, would be exempted from the tax.

The Newspaper Tax

The newspaper tax would be expanded through the Six Acts to include all publications which sold for less than six pence, contained an opinion about news, or which were published more frequently than every twenty-six days. It was repealed on 1 July 1855.

Background
The tax was implemented with the stated intention of raising funds for the English state lottery, to monitor the circulation of newspapers and other periodicals, and to restrict publication of writing intended to "excite hatred and contempt of the Government and holy religion". All periodicals were already required by law to state the address and name of the owner, making taxation easily enforced on publishers, and allowing the government to see where legally printed publications were coming from. In order to exempt themselves from the tax, periodical authors pledged their patronage to members of the Parliament of Great Britain, leading to publications rising and falling based on the party in power and a general distrust in periodicals of the time.

Response
British essayists were critical of the tax and the effect it had on British literature. According to English writer Samuel Johnson, "A news-writer is a man without virtue who writes lies at home for his own profit.  To these compositions is required neither genius nor knowledge, neither industry nor sprightliness, but contempt of shame and indifference to truth are absolutely necessary." These essayists often saw retribution for their published words; Henry Hetherington, a prominent radical, was imprisoned for claiming the tax was a tax on knowledge, and his printing presses were ordered to be destroyed. Many others greeted the arrival of the stamps with outrage and violence. Most called for a boycott and some organized attacks on the customhouses and homes of tax collectors.

References

Sources
 

Great Britain Acts of Parliament 1712
Tax legislation in the United Kingdom